Monopods (also called sciapods, skiapods, skiapodes) were mythological dwarf-like creatures with a single, large foot extending from a leg centred in the middle of their bodies. The names monopod and skiapod (σκιάποδες) are both Greek, respectively meaning "one-foot" and "shadow-foot".

Ancient Greek and Roman literature 

Monopods appear in Aristophanes' play The Birds, first performed in 414 BC. They are described by Pliny the Elder in his Natural History, where he reports travelers' stories from encounters or sightings of Monopods in India. Pliny remarks that they are first mentioned by Ctesias in his book Indika (India), a record of the view of Persians of India which only remains in fragments. Pliny describes Monopods like this:

Philostratus mentions Skiapodes in his Life of Apollonius of Tyana, which was cited by Eusebius in his Treatise Against Hierocles. Apollonius of Tyana believes the Skiapodes live in India and Ethiopia, and asks the Indian sage Iarkhas about their existence.

St. Augustine (354–430) mentions the "Skiopodes" in The City of God, Book 16, Chapter 8 entitled "Whether Certain Monstrous Races of Men Are Derived From the Stock of Adam or Noah's Sons", and mentions that it is uncertain whether such creatures exist.

Medieval literature 

Reference to the legend continued into the Middle Ages, for example with Isidore of Seville in his Etymologiae, where he writes:

The Hereford Mappa Mundi, drawn c. 1300, shows a sciapod on one side of the world, as does a world map drawn by Beatus of Liébana (c. 730 – c. 800).

Einfœtingr of Canada 

A race of the "One-Legged", or the "Uniped" was allegedly encountered by Thorfinn Karlsefni and his group of Icelandic settlers in North America in the early 11th century, according to Eiríks saga rauða (Saga of Erik the Red). The presence of "unipedes maritimi" in Greenland was marked on Claudius Clavus's map dated 1427. 

According to the saga, Karlsefni Thorvald Eiriksson and others assembled a search party for Thorhall, and sailed around Kjalarnes and then south. After sailing for a long time, while moored on the south side of a west-flowing river, they were shot at by a one-footed man (einfœtingr), and Thorvald died from an arrow wound.

The saga goes on to relate that the party went northward and approached what they guessed to be Einfœtingaland ("Land of the One-Legged" or "Country of the Unipeds").

Origin 
According to Carl A. P. Ruck, the Monopods's cited existence in India refers to the Vedic Aja Ekapad ("Not-born Single-foot"), an epithet for Soma. Since Soma is a botanical deity the single foot would represent the stem of an entheogenic plant or fungus.

John of Marignolli (1338–1353) provides another explanation of these creatures. Quote from his travels from India:

Fiction

Chronicles of Narnia
C.S. Lewis features monopods in the book The Voyage of the Dawn Treader, a part of his children's  series The Chronicles of Narnia.

In the story, a tribe of foolish dwarves known as Duffers inhabit a small island near the edge of the Narnian world along with a magician named Coriakin, who has transformed them into monopods as a punishment. They have become so unhappy with their appearance that they have made themselves invisible. They are (re)discovered by explorers from the Narnian ship, the Dawn Treader, which has landed on the island to rest and resupply, and at their request Lucy Pevensie makes them visible again. Through confusion between their old name, "Duffers", and their new name of "Monopods", they become known as the "Dufflepuds".

According to Brian Sibley's book The Land of Narnia, Lewis may have based their appearance on drawings from the Hereford Mappa Mundi.

Baudolino
Umberto Eco in his novel Baudolino describes a sciapod named Gavagai. The name of the creature "Gavagai" is a reference to Quine's example of indeterminacy of translation.

The Name of the Rose
In Umberto Eco's novel The Name of the Rose, the abbey's chapter house is decorated with carvings of "the inhabitants of unknown worlds," including "sciopods, who run swiftly on their single leg and when they want to take shelter from the sun stretch out and hold up their great foot like an umbrella."

See also
 Aziza (African mythology)
 Congenital amputation
 Sirenomelia
 Fachan
 Invunche
 Kasa-obake
 Kui (Chinese mythology)
 Nasnas 
 Saci (Brazilian folklore)
 Patasola

Explanatory notes

References
Citations

External links

 http://web.cn.edu/kwheeler/monster_list.html
 http://www.henry-davis.com/MAPS/EMwebpages/207.1mono.html
 http://www.westgallerychurches.com/Suffolk/indexsflk.html
 https://web.archive.org/web/20061205213734/http://www.kunst.no/mono/panot/utgivelser.htm

Mythic humanoids
Fantasy creatures
Greek legendary creatures
Medieval European legendary creatures
Mythological peoples
Legendary tribes in Greco-Roman historiography
Legendary creatures with absent body parts